The Scarlet Thread is a 1996 novel written by Francine Rivers. It was published by Tyndale House Publishers.

Plot introduction
Sierra Clanton Madrid can't believe her husband Alex would take a new job and uproot the family to Los Angeles without consulting her. Armed with righteous anger, Sierra turns their home into a battleground, even after they make the move. Alex chases success, both business and social, to compensate for his insecurities about his Hispanic immigrant roots. Both Alex and Sierra are so caught up in themselves that neither tries to understand the other or seeks God's will. Soon their perfect marriage lies in shambles. Seeing the need for God, Sierra's mother gives her the journal of a female ancestor and a handcrafted quilt made with a scarlet thread.

1996 American novels
Novels by Francine Rivers
American Christian novels
Novels set in Los Angeles